Grace Gershuny (born 1950) is an American organic farmer, writer, and leader in the organic farming movement.

She is the author of books and articles on soil management and composting. She was editor of the Organic Farmer: The Digest of Sustainable Agriculture. 

She serves on the faculty of the Institute for Social Ecology.

She lives in Barnet, Vermont.

Books
The Soul of Soil
Start with the Soil Rodale Press, 1993
Compost, Vermicompost and Compost Tea: Feeding the Soil on the Organic Farm
The Organic Revolutionary: A Memoir from the Movement for Real Food, Planetary Healing, and Human Liberation 2020

References

External links
 Official website

Organic farmers
1950 births
Living people